Tamás Beck (26 February 1929 – 20 August 2014) was a Hungarian politician who served as Minister of Trade between 1988 and 1990.

Biography
Beck joined 1976 the Hungarian Socialist Workers' Party (Magyar Szocialista Munkáspárt – MSZMP). 1985 he was promoted to be a member of the committee for economic policy of his party and on 23 June 1987 he was elected to be a member of the Central Committee of the MSZMP.

On 5 October 1988 Beck became Minister of Trade in the cabinet of Prime Minister Miklós Németh until 23 May 1990.

References

1929 births
2014 deaths
Hungarian engineers
Government ministers of Hungary
Members of the Hungarian Socialist Workers' Party
Politicians from Budapest